Elizabeth of York (11 February 1466 – 11 February 1503) was Queen of England from her marriage to King Henry VII on 18 January 1486 until her death in 1503. Elizabeth married Henry after his victory at the Battle of Bosworth Field, which marked the end of the Wars of the Roses. They had seven children together.

Elizabeth's younger brothers, the "Princes in the Tower", mysteriously disappeared shortly after the death of her father, King Edward IV. Although the 1484 act of Parliament Titulus Regius declared the marriage of her parents, Edward and Elizabeth Woodville, as invalid, she and her sisters were welcomed back to court by Edward's brother, King Richard III. The final victory of the Lancastrian faction in the Wars of the Roses may have seemed a further disaster for the Yorkist princess. But Henry Tudor knew the importance of Yorkist support for his invasion and promised to marry Elizabeth before he arrived in England. This may well have contributed to the haemorrhaging of Yorkist support for Richard.

Elizabeth seems to have played little part in politics. Her marriage appears to have been a successful and happy one, although her eldest son Arthur, Prince of Wales, died at age 15 in 1502, and three other children died young. Her second and only surviving son became King Henry VIII of England, while her daughters Margaret and Mary became queens of Scotland and of France, respectively.

Ancestry and early life

Birth  
Elizabeth of York was born at the Palace of Westminster as the eldest child of King Edward IV and his wife, Elizabeth Woodville. Her christening was celebrated at Westminster Abbey, sponsored by her grandmothers, Jacquetta of Luxembourg, Duchess of Bedford, and Cecily Neville, Duchess of York. Her third sponsor was her cousin, Richard Neville, 16th Earl of Warwick.

In 1469, aged three, she was briefly betrothed to George Neville, who was created the Duke of Bedford in anticipation of the marriage. His father, John later supported George's uncle, the Earl of Warwick, in a rebellion against King Edward IV, and the betrothal was called off. In 1475, Louis XI agreed to the marriage of nine-year-old Elizabeth of York to his son Charles, the Dauphin of France. In 1482, however, Louis XI reneged on his promise. She was named a Lady of the Garter in 1477, at age eleven, along with her mother and her paternal aunt Elizabeth of York, Duchess of Suffolk.

Sister of King Edward V

On 9 April 1483, Elizabeth's father, King Edward IV, unexpectedly died and her younger brother, Edward V, ascended to the throne; her uncle, Richard, Duke of Gloucester, was appointed regent and protector of his nephews. Gloucester took steps to isolate his nephews from their Woodville relations, including their own mother.

He intercepted Edward V while the latter was travelling from Ludlow, where he had been living as Prince of Wales, to London to be crowned king. Edward V was placed in the royal residence of the Tower of London, ostensibly for his protection, while his uncle Anthony Woodville, and half-brother Richard Grey, who had both been escorting him, were arrested and sent to Pontefract Castle. Elizabeth Woodville fled with her younger son Richard and her daughters, taking sanctuary in Westminster Abbey. Gloucester asked Archbishop Bourchier to take Richard with him, so that the boy could reside in the Tower and keep his brother Edward company. Elizabeth Woodville, under duress, eventually agreed.

Two months later, on 22 June 1483, Edward IV's marriage was declared invalid. It was claimed that Edward IV had, at the time of his marriage to Elizabeth Woodville, already been betrothed to Lady Eleanor Butler. Parliament issued a bill, Titulus Regius ("Royal Title"), in support of this position. This measure legally bastardised the children of Edward IV, made them ineligible for the succession, and declared Gloucester the rightful king, with the right of succession reverting to children of George, 1st Duke of Clarence, another late brother of Gloucester, who had been attainted in 1478. Elizabeth's uncle Anthony Woodville, and her half-brother Richard Grey, were executed on Gloucester's orders on 25 June. Gloucester ascended to the throne as Richard III on 6 July 1483, and Edward and Richard disappeared soon afterwards. Rumours began to spread that they had been murdered, and these appear to have been increasingly widely credited, even though some undoubtedly emanated from overseas.

Niece of King Richard III
According to only a single much later Tudor source, Polydore Vergil, Elizabeth's mother made an alliance with Lady Margaret Beaufort, mother of Henry Tudor, later King Henry VII, who presented himself as the closest claimant to the throne among the Lancastrian party. Although Henry Tudor was descended from King Edward III, his claim to the throne was weak, owing to an Act of Parliament of the reign of Richard II in the 1390s, which barred accession to the throne to any heirs of the legitimised offspring of Henry's great-great-grandparents, John of Gaunt and Katherine Swynford. Whether such an unprecedented Act had force of law is disputed.. Furthermore, there were legitimate Lancastrian lines into the Royal Houses of Portugal and Castile. Whatever the merits of Henry's claim, according to Vergil, his mother and Elizabeth Woodville agreed he should move to claim the throne and, once he had taken it, marry Elizabeth of York to boost his feeble claim. In December 1483, in the cathedral of Rennes, Henry Tudor swore an oath promising to marry her and began planning an invasion.

In 1484, Elizabeth of York and her sisters left Westminster Abbey and returned to court when Elizabeth Woodville was apparently reconciled with Richard III. This may or may not suggest that Elizabeth Woodville believed Richard III to be innocent of any possible role in the murder of her two sons. It was rumoured that Richard III intended to marry Elizabeth of York because his wife, Anne Neville, was dying and they had no surviving children. The Crowland Chronicle claimed that Richard III was forced to deny this unsavoury rumour. Soon after Anne Neville's death, Richard III sent Elizabeth away from court to the castle of Sheriff Hutton and opened negotiations with King John II of Portugal to marry his sister, Joan, Princess of Portugal, and to have Elizabeth marry their cousin, the future King Manuel I of Portugal.

Henry Tudor and his army landed in Wales on 7 August 1485 and marched inland. On 22 August, Henry Tudor and Richard III fought the Battle of Bosworth Field. Richard III had the larger army, but was betrayed by one of his most powerful retainers, William Stanley, and died in battle. Henry Tudor took the crown by right of conquest as Henry VII.

Queen of England

Marriage to Henry VII 
Though initially slow to keep his promise, Henry VII acknowledged the necessity of marrying Elizabeth of York to ensure the stability of his rule and weaken the claims of other surviving members of the House of York. It seems Henry wished to be seen as ruling in his own right, having claimed the throne by right of conquest and not by his marriage to the de facto heiress of the House of York. He had no intention of sharing power.

Henry VII had the Act of Titulus Regius repealed, thereby legitimising anew the children of Edward IV, and acknowledging Edward V as his predecessor. Though Richard III was regarded as a usurper, his reign was not ignored. Henry and Elizabeth required a papal dispensation to wed because of Canon Law frowning upon "affinity": Henry and Elizabeth were descended from, respectively, John of Gaunt and his younger brother Edmund in the 4th degree, an issue that had caused much dispute and bloodshed as to which claim was superior. Two applications were sent, the first more locally, and the second one was slow in reaching Rome and slow to return with the response of the Pope. Ultimately, however, the marriage was approved by papal bull of Pope Innocent VIII dated March 1486 (one month after the wedding) stating that the Pope and his advisors "Approveth confirmyth and stablishyth the matrimonye and coniuncion made betwene our sou[er]ayn lord King Henre the seuenth of the house of Lancastre of that one party And the noble Princesse Elyzabeth of the house of Yorke."

Because the journey to Rome and back took many months, and because Henry as king wanted to be certain that nobody could claim that his wedding to Elizabeth was unlawful or sinful, the more local application was obeyed first—it was sent to the papal legate for England and Scotland, which returned in January 1486. Cardinal Bourchier, Archbishop of Canterbury, officiated at the wedding of Henry VII and Elizabeth of York on 18 January 1486. Their first son, Arthur, was born on 20 September 1486, eight months after their marriage. Elizabeth of York was crowned queen on 25 November 1487. She gave birth to several more children, but only four survived infancy: Arthur, Margaret, Henry and Mary.

Relationship with Henry Tudor 

Despite their marriage being a political arrangement, records indicate both partners appear to have slowly fallen in love with each other. Thomas Penn, in his biography of Henry VII writes that "[t]hough founded on pragmatism, Henry and Elizabeth's marriage had nevertheless blossomed throughout the uncertainty and upheaval of the previous eighteen years. This was a marriage of 'faithful love', of mutual attraction, affection and respect, from which the king seems to have drawn great strength." 

Henry understood the importance of pageantry to the establishment of a new dynasty. To distinguish himself as more secure in his reign than his predecessors, he valued demonstrating his wealth to foreign ambassadors of France and Spain. Elizabeth, who had been living and learning at her father's court until his death, contributed her knowledge of royal court etiquette. Elizabeth and her mother-in-law would shape the court's outward appearance, as Henry had not seen England since he was fourteen years old. 

In order to maintain stability and peace after ending a civil war that had lasted 32 years, the new Tudor dynasty needed to put an end to the quarrelling Yorkist and Lancastrian families. Elizabeth's sisters, Cecily and Anne of York, and her cousin, Margaret Pole, were married to Lancastrian men who were loyal to Henry. Similar strategies had been used before by Richard III of England, though in that case the Titulus Regius had marred the status of Elizabeth and all of her sisters as illegitimate, and Richard had no intention of making it difficult for the two sides of the conflict to return to factionalism when two were married into one- his actions showed he was more interested in loyalty and eliminating rival claims by wedding them off to the inconsequential. Richard did this directly to Elizabeth's sister, Cecily, by wedding her to Richard Scrope. Elizabeth, therefore, had a motive to see to the successful welfare of her female relatives, but by no means could she foresee whether it would guarantee peace at last.

Further complicating things is that the public image of Henry Tudor that has been handed down through time only accords with the last years of his reign. Where, when, and how he spent his money is traceable by surviving documents, some written by the king himself and many more having his signature "Henry R" to indicate his oversight of entries, both his personal and the realm's finances, documented in careful detail. Surviving in the British National Archives are letters written by Elizabeth of York and also a records of her privy purse, supplying evidence that the rumour regarding Henry's mistreatment of his wife could be false. Elizabeth was a very pious woman and one of her life passions was charity, one of the three theological virtues of the Catholic Church. She gave away money and alms in very large quantities, to the point she indebted herself on many occasions. She also gave generously to monks and religious orders. Much of the criticism regarding the reign of Elizabeth's husband derives from the sneers of the nobility of the age, who were bitter about the recentralisation of power with the king in London, and the later viciously critical views of Francis Bacon, but evidence from the British National Archives along with more recent work in archaeology present a much different portrait where Elizabeth had a much more generous, kind, and doting husband in Henry Tudor behind the public perception. Behind the scenes, the evidence reveals a man who opened the purse strings for his children, mother, and wife and had a penchant for music, merrymaking, and dance on specific special occasions and in spite of many enemies made at the climax of the Wars of the Roses, there were still staunch supporters and friends of Henry, and that Elizabeth had won their trust.

The records state that Elsyng Palace was one of two nurseries for Henry and Elizabeth's children and they are both places where Elizabeth spent much of her time when not at court. Within a year of the Battle of Bosworth, a friend of Henry Tudor, Thomas Lovell, began expanding and improving upon the Elsyng property to make it fit for Elizabeth, her husband, and her children-to-be, completed by the time of the birth of Prince Henry with inner and outer courts and ample places to play for the royal children. This was largely done as a gift, but it was completed in the newer Renaissance style and in time was suitable enough for Henry and Elizabeth's grandchildren and proves it was a much loved refuge for the king and his wife.

Elizabeth received a grand coronation where she was carried on a royal barge down the Thames, and more recent evidence suggests that Henry VII was as much a builder as his son and granddaughter and that his wife shared that interest: it is known now that Elizabeth had a hand in designing the former Greenwich Palace and that the Palace itself was well appointed for large scale entertaining. Records are very clear that Christmas was a raucous and special time for the royal family on the whole, evidenced by many surviving documents depicting a particularly lively court having a marvelous time, with copious amounts of imported wine, great amounts of money spent upon roasted meats, and entertainers. Henry also frequently bought gifts for Elizabeth and their children. The account books, kept by Henry, demonstrates that he spent a great deal of gold on expensive cloth for himself, his wife and his children.

Elizabeth of York did not exercise much political influence as queen due to her strong-minded mother-in-law Lady Margaret Beaufort, but she was reported to be gentle, kind and generous to her relations, servants and benefactors. One report does state that Henry VII chose to appoint Elizabeth's choice for a vacant Bishopric over his mother's choice, showing Henry's affection for, and willingness to listen to, Elizabeth. She seems to have had a love of books, patronising the English printer William Caxton. Elizabeth of York enjoyed music, dancing, and gambling; the last of these was a pastime she shared with her husband. She also kept greyhounds.

As queen, Elizabeth made arrangements for the education of her younger children, including the future Henry VIII. She also accompanied her husband on his diplomatic visit to Calais in 1500 to meet with Philip I of Castile, and she corresponded with Queen Isabella I of Castile before their children's marriage.

On 14 November 1501, Elizabeth of York's 15-year-old son Arthur married Catherine of Aragon, daughter of King Ferdinand II of Aragon and Queen Isabella I of Castile. The pair were sent to Ludlow Castle, the traditional residence of the Prince of Wales. Arthur died in April 1502. The news of Arthur's death caused Henry VII to break down in grief, as much in fear for his dynasty as in mourning for his son. Elizabeth comforted him, telling him that he was the only child of his mother but had survived to become king, that God had left him with a son and two daughters, and that they were both young enough to have more children. When she returned to her own chambers, however, Elizabeth herself broke down with grief. Her attendants sent for Henry who, in turn, comforted her.

Death and aftermath 

In 1502, Elizabeth of York became pregnant once more and spent her confinement period in the Tower of London. Her embroiderer Robynet made her a new rich bed with curtains decorated with clouds and roses. On 2 February 1503, she gave birth to a daughter, Katherine, who died a few days later. Succumbing to a postpartum infection, Elizabeth of York died on 11 February, her 37th birthday. Her family seems to have been devastated by her death and mourned her deeply. According to one biographer, the death of Elizabeth "broke the heart" of her husband and "shattered him." Another account says that Henry Tudor "privily departed to a solitary place and would no man should resort unto him." This is notable considering that, shortly after Elizabeth's death, records show he became deathly ill himself and would not allow any except his mother Margaret Beaufort near him, including doctors. For Henry Tudor to show his emotions, let alone any sign of infirmity, was highly unusual and alarming to members of his court. Within a little over two years, King Henry VII had lost his oldest son, his wife, his baby daughter, and found himself having to honour the Treaty of Perpetual Peace.

In 2012, the Vaux Passional, an illuminated manuscript that was once the property of Henry VII, was rediscovered in the National Library of Wales. It depicts the aftermath of Elizabeth's death vividly. Henry VII is shown receiving the book containing the manuscript in mourning robes with a doleful expression on his face. In the background, behind their father, are the late queen's daughters, Mary and Margaret, in black veils. The red head of 11-year-old Prince Henry is shown weeping into the sheets of his mother's empty bed.

Henry VII entertained thoughts of remarriage to renew the alliance with Spain—Joanna, Dowager Queen of Naples (daughter of Ferdinand I of Naples), Joanna, Queen of Castile (daughter of Ferdinand and Isabella), and Margaret, Dowager Duchess of Savoy (sister-in-law of Joanna of Castile), were all considered —but he died a widower in 1509. The specifications that Henry gave to his ambassadors outlining what he wanted in a second wife described Elizabeth. On each anniversary of her death, he decreed that a requiem mass be sung, the bells be tolled, and 100 candles be lit in her honour. Henry also continued to employ her minstrels each New Year.

The Tower of London was abandoned as a royal residence, as evidenced by the lack of records of its being used by the royal family after 1503. Royal births in the reign of Elizabeth's son, Henry VIII, took place in various other palaces.

Henry VII's reputation for miserliness became worse after Elizabeth's death.

He was buried with Elizabeth of York under their effigies in his Westminster Abbey chapel. Her tomb was opened in the 19th century and the wood casing of her lead coffin was found to have been removed to create space for the interment of her great-great-grandson James VI and I.

Children 
 Arthur, Prince of Wales (20 September 1486 – 2 April 1502)
 Margaret, Queen of Scotland (28 November 1489 – 18 October 1541)
 Henry VIII, King of England (28 June 1491 – 28 January 1547)
 Elizabeth (2 July 1492 – 14 September 1495), buried in St Edward's Chapel, Westminster Abbey
 Mary, Queen of France (18 March 1496 – 25 June 1533)
 Edmund (21 February 1499 – 19 June 1500), buried in Westminster Abbey
 Katherine (2 February 1503 – 10 or 18 February 1503), buried in Westminster Abbey

Appearance and legacy 

According to folklore, the "queen ... in the parlour" in the children's nursery rhyme "Sing a Song of Sixpence" is Elizabeth of York, while her husband is the king counting his money. The symbol of the Tudor dynasty is the Tudor rose, which became a royal symbol for England upon Elizabeth's marriage to Henry VII in 1486. Her White Rose of York is most commonly proper to her husband's Red Rose of Lancaster and today, uncrowned, is still the floral emblem of England.

Elizabeth of York was renowned as a great beauty for her time, with regular features, tall, and a fair complexion, inheriting many traits from her father and her mother Elizabeth Woodville, who was considered at one point the most beautiful woman in the British Isles. All other Tudor monarchs inherited her reddish gold hair and the trait became synonymous with the dynasty.

Depiction in media 
 In 1995, she was portrayed by Kate Steavenson-Payne in the feature film Richard III;
 In 2013, she was portrayed by Freya Mavor in the BBC series The White Queen;
 In 2017, Elizabeth was portrayed by Jodie Comer in the BBC series The White Princess;
 In 2019, she was portrayed by Alexandra Moen in the Starz series The Spanish Princess.

Ancestry

References

Sources

External links 

1466 births
1503 deaths
15th-century English women
16th-century English women
15th-century English people
Burials at Westminster Abbey
Deaths in childbirth
English princesses
English royal consorts
Henry VII of England
House of Tudor
House of York
Irish royal consorts
Ladies of the Garter
People from Westminster
English Roman Catholics
Children of Edward IV of England
Daughters of kings